Jeffrey Frank Allam (born 19 December 1954 in Epsom, England), is a former British racing driver who made his name in Saloon Car racing. He now works as Head of Business for Allam Motor Services in Epsom which are a Skoda sales and service and Vauxhall servicing dealership.

Racing career

Starting in kart racing he soon progressed to saloon car racing winning regularly in Vauxhalls. He first entered the British Saloon Car Championship in 1978 driving a Ford Capri 3.0, finishing 2nd in class. In 1979 he repeated this with another 2nd place in class. In 1981 he drove a TWR Rover Vitesse, taking Rover's first overall win in the championship. Allam continued to drive for TWR Rover again in 1982, this time winning the class title. He was paired with Frank Sytner for the 1982 season, but Sytner left the team partway through the year. The following year saw Allam partnering Steve Soper and Pete Lovett in the Rover team, and the three drivers dominated the year, easily winning the manufacturers championship and Soper winning the drivers' title. However, the success was short-lived, as the Rovers were found to be in breach of the regulations regarding the engine installation, and TWR was thrown out of the championship, handing victory to Andy Rouse.

His success continued afterwards, winning the new Group A class at the 1984 Bathurst 1000 in Australia driving a TWR Rover partnered by regular ETCC co-driver Armin Hahne from Germany. This was followed in 1986 when he won the prestigious ETCC Tourist Trophy at Silverstone in a TWR prepared Rover along with co-driver, former Formula One World Champion Denny Hulme. He was then champion in the TVR Tuscan Challenge in 1989.

Allam continued to be a regular at the Bathurst 1000 after his 1984 class win. In 1985 he was lead driver in the 2nd TWR Jaguar XJS with Aussie Ron Dickson, qualifying a fine second behind team boss Walkinshaw, but was out on lap 3 after broken headlight glass found its way into the Jaguar's V12 engine causing enough damage to stop the car. TWR itself dominated the 1985 race with the team's 3rd car (driven by Hahne and Aussie John Goss) winning with Walkinshaw and Win Percy finishing 3rd in the lead car after late race problems which saw a split oil line. He missed both 1986 and 1987, before returning in 1988 with Walkinshaw to drive the new Fuel injected Holden VL Commodore SS Group A SV. The race ended early for the duo when the suspension collapsed under the Boss after just 5 laps. After driving a Rover, Jaguar and a Holden in Australia's Great Race, Allam drove a Ford Sierra RS500 in 1989 for Dick Johnson Racing. He finished 8th in 1989 (team boss Dick Johnson and regular team driver John Bowe won the race), before recording his best finish in 1990, again in a Johnson Sierra, when he partnered Kiwi racer Paul Radisich to second place. Ironically, the winner of the 1990 Bathurst 1000 was the Holden Racing Team VL Commodore SS Group A SV driven by Allan Grice and Allam's long time TWR teammate Win Percy. The Winning Commodore was in fact the same car (rebuilt) that Allam was to drive with Walkinshaw in the 1988 race.

In 1990 Allam returned to the British Touring Car Championship (formerly the British Saloon Car Championship) driving a BMW M3 in the 2.0l class for Vic Lee Motorsport, placing 6th in the series. In 1991 he drove for the works Vauxhall team in a Vauxhall Cavalier finishing sixth. He stayed with the Vauxhall team a further three years, partnering John Cleland, finishing in 4th place with two race wins in 1992 and a 9th-place finishing in 1993. In 1994 he placed 10th overall and was replaced the following year by James Thompson.  He made a one-off comeback to the BTCC in 1995 replacing the injured Thompson at Knockhill.

In 2004 he was selected to drive in the BTCC Masters event at Donington Park. a race which was set up by the director of TOCA Alan J. Gow featuring former champions and legends. Driving the same SEAT Leon Cupras, he finished 8th out of a field of sixteen drivers.

In May 2011 Jeff Allam was appointed as Driving Standards Advisor to the BTCC, assisting the Clerk of the Course in investigating on-track incidents between competitors. He previously held this role in the mid-late Nineties.

Racing record

Complete British Saloon / Touring Car Championship results
(key) (Races in bold indicate pole position – 1973–1990 in class) (Races in italics indicate fastest lap – 1 point awarded ?–1989 in class)

 – Race was stopped due to heavy rain. No points were awarded.

† Events with 2 races staged for the different classes.

‡ Endurance driver.

Complete European Touring Car Championship results
(key) (Races in bold indicate pole position) (Races in italics indicate fastest lap)

Complete World Touring Car Championship results
(key) (Races in bold indicate pole position) (Races in italics indicate fastest lap)

† Not eligible for series points

Complete Asia-Pacific Touring Car Championship results
(key) (Races in bold indicate pole position) (Races in italics indicate fastest lap)

Complete Australian Super Touring Championship results
(key) (Races in bold indicate pole position) (Races in italics indicate fastest lap)

Complete Bathurst 1000 results

Complete 24 Hours of Le Mans results

References

1954 births
Living people
British Touring Car Championship drivers
English racing drivers
24 Hours of Le Mans drivers
World Sportscar Championship drivers
Sportspeople from Epsom
European Touring Car Championship drivers
Australian Endurance Championship drivers
Dick Johnson Racing drivers